Robert G. Coleman (January 5, 1923 – October 18, 2020) was an American geologist.

Career
He was a member of the United States National Academy of Sciences. His primary field of expertise was the formation and plate tectonic setting of ophiolites and ultramafic rocks. He was a retired professor of Geology from Stanford University and retired from the U.S. Geological Survey. He continued to conduct research and publish scientific books and articles.

References

American geologists
1923 births
2020 deaths
Stanford University Department of Geology faculty
Members of the United States National Academy of Sciences
Foreign Members of the Russian Academy of Sciences